Tamiko Jones (born Barbara Tamiko Ferguson, 1945) is an American singer.  Her most successful record was "Touch Me Baby (Reaching Out For Your Love)" in 1975.

Career
Barbara Tamiko Ferguson was born in Kyle, West Virginia, and has part Japanese, British, and Cherokee ancestry. Her middle name, Tamiko, is of Japanese origin. She was raised in Detroit where she first started singing she made her professional debut in a club in 1961. She began her career performing pop songs in a jazz style. Her first record release, credited simply as Timiko, was "Is It A Sin?", issued by Checker Records in 1963. She moved to the Atco label, where she recorded "Rhapsody" as Tamiko in 1964.

By 1966 she had moved to the Golden World label, recording "I'm Spellbound". Next she moved to Atlantic Records, where she released several singles during 1967, including "Boy You're Growing On Me".  That year, she also recorded the album A Mann and a Woman with jazz flutist Herbie Mann. During the 1960s, she also appeared as an extra in several movies. 

In 1968, after being hospitalized with polio, she met singer Solomon Burke, and they recorded several duets on his album I'll Be Anything for You. Jones became Burke's fiancée and manager for a time, and co-produced his single "Proud Mary".  She also recorded the album I'll Be Anything For You, and a single "Goodnight My Love", for Creed Taylor's CTI label, followed by the album Tamiko for the December label.  In 1969 her album In Muscle Shoals was issued on the Metromedia label.

Her first chart hit, and most successful record, was "Touch Me Baby (Reaching Out For Your Love)", written by Johnny Bristol and issued by Arista Records, which reached no. 12 on the Billboard R&B chart and no. 60 on the US pop chart in 1975.  Its follow-up, "Just You and Me", reached no. 78 on the R&B chart. She also released an album, Love Trip.   

In 1976, the single "Let It Flow" (no. 76 R&B) was released on the Contempo label, owned by John Abbey, who was also the British founder and editor of Blues & Soul magazine. She and Abbey married in Atlanta, Georgia in 1977.

In 1977, "Cloudy", on the Atlantis label, made no. 92 on the R&B chart, and in 1979 her version of "Can't Live Without Your Love", written and arranged by Randy Muller of Brass Construction and issued on the Polydor label, reached no. 70 on the same chart.  Her last R&B chart hit was a version of Marvin Gaye's "I Want You", recorded on the Sutra label and which made no. 81 in 1986. In the early 1990s, Tamiko she worked as Smokey Robinson's manager.

Discography

Chart singles

Albums
A Mann & A Woman (Atlantic, 1967) with Herbie Mann
I'll Be Anything For You (CTI, 1968)
Tamiko (1968)
In Muscle Shoals (1969)
Love Trip (1975)
Cloudy (1976)
Let It Flow (1977)

As backing vocalist
With Herbie Mann
The Beat Goes On (Atlantic, 1967)

References

External links

1945 births
20th-century African-American women singers
American people of British descent
American people of Cherokee descent
American people of Japanese descent
American women pop singers
American soul singers
Living people
People from McDowell County, West Virginia
Singers from West Virginia
Singers from Detroit
American rhythm and blues singers
20th-century American women singers
20th-century American singers
21st-century African-American people
21st-century African-American women